A drivetrain (also frequently spelled as drive train or sometimes drive-train) is the group of components that deliver mechanical power from the prime mover to the driven components. In automotive engineering, the drivetrain  is the components of a motor vehicle that deliver power to the drive wheels. This excludes the engine or motor that generates the power. In marine applications, the drive shaft will drive a propeller, thruster, or waterjet rather than a drive axle, while the actual engine might be  similar to an automotive engine. Other machinery, equipment and vehicles may also use a drivetrain to deliver power from the engine(s) to the driven components.

In contrast, the powertrain is considered to include both the engine and/or motor(s) as well as the drivetrain.

Function 
The function of the drivetrain is to couple the engine that produces the power to the driving wheels that use this mechanical power to rotate the axle. This connection involves physically linking the two components, which may be at opposite ends of the vehicle and so requiring a long propeller shaft or drive shaft. The operating speed of the engine and wheels are also different and must be matched by the correct gear ratio. As the vehicle speed changes, the ideal engine speed must remain approximately constant for efficient operation and so this gearbox ratio must also be changed, either manually, automatically or by an automatic continuous variation.

Automotive components 
The precise components of the drivetrain vary, according to the type of vehicle.

Some typical examples:

Manual transmission car 

 Flywheel
 Dual mass flywheel still rare
 Clutch
 Gearbox
 Overdrive Since the adoption of 5 speeds has become standard 
 Propeller shaft
 Rear axle
 Final drive
 Differential

Automatic transmission car 
 Torque converter
 Transmission
 Propeller shaft
 Rear axle
 Spool
 Differential

Front-wheel drive car 

 Clutch
 Transaxle
 Gearbox
 Final drive
 Differential
 Drive shafts and constant-velocity joints to each wheel

Four-wheel drive off-road vehicle 

 Clutch
 Gearbox 
 Transfer box
 Transmission brake
 Propeller shafts, to front and rear
 Front and rear axles
 Final drive
 Locking differential
 Portal gear

Final drive

The final drive is the last in the set of components which delivers torque to the drive wheels. In a road vehicle, it incorporates the differential. In a railway vehicle, it sometimes incorporates the reversing gear. Examples include the Self-Changing Gears RF 28 (used in many first-generation diesel multiple units of British Railways) and RF 11 used in the British Rail Class 03 and British Rail Class 04 diesel shunting locomotives.
In a motor vehicle, the powertrain consists of the source of propulsion (e.g. the engine or electric motor) and the drivetrain system which transfers this energy into forward movement of the vehicle.

Powertrain

Definition 
The powertrain consists of the prime mover (e.g. an internal combustion engine and/or one or more traction motors) and the drivetrain - all of the components that convert the prime mover's power into movement of the vehicle (e.g. the transmission, driveshafts, differential and axles); whereas the drivetrain does not include the power source and consists of the transmission, driveshafts, differential and axles.

Power sources 
Most passenger cars and commercial vehicles are powered by either an internal combustion engine, electric motor(s) or a combination of the two.

The most common types of internal combustion engines are:
 petrol engines
 diesel engines
 ethanol blends (such as E85 and E10)
 liquefied petroleum gas

Most purely electric vehicles use batteries for energy storage and are referred to as battery electric vehicles.

Vehicles with both internal combustion engines and electric motors are called hybrid vehicles. If a hybrid vehicle includes a charging socket, it is considered to be a plug-in hybrid, while vehicles that do not include a charging socket (therefore relying on the engine or regenerative braking to charge the batteries) are considered to be mild hybrids.

Powered vessels

Aircraft

Railway locomotives

Other

See also

References

 
Automotive technologies